Nogometni Klub Zrinski Jurjevac Punitovački is a Croatian football club based in the eastern village of Jurjevac Punitovački, located close to Osijek.

History 
Zrinski was established in 1937 and the owner of a local store, Adam Buček–Ribička, is considered the founder of the club. The club was initially called Sloga, but only four days later it was agreed to rename the club Zrinski after one of Croatia's greats. Officially NK Zrinski was founded on March 1, 1970, when it entered the Municipality of Đakovo register of social organizations. The club's greatest successes before the Yugoslav Wars were playing in the then Intermunicipal League East (1984/85 season).

Since the establishment of the Republic of Croatia, Zrinski had been playing in the 3rd ŽNL Osijek-Baranja until the 2004/2005 season when they clinched promotion as league champions to the 2nd ŽNL. After three seasons, they became league champions of the 2nd ŽNL Osijek-Baranja in the 2008/2009 season and thus reached the 1st ŽNL Osijek-Baranja. In the 2011/2012 season, Zrinski became champions of the 1st ŽNL Osijek-Baranja and moved to the Inter-County League (4th tier) in which clubs from the Osijek-Baranja and Vukovar-Srijem counties compete, thus achieving the success earned by the generation from the 1984/85 season.

Stadium 
NK Zrinski host domestic matches at NK Čepin in neighbouring Čepin which has a capacity of around 2,500.

Recent seasons

Current squad

References

External links 
 Offical website
  at Croatian Football Federation 

Association football clubs established in 1937
Football clubs in Croatia
Football clubs in Osijek-Baranja County
1937 establishments in Croatia